Calpoparia is a genus of moths of the family Noctuidae.

Species
 Calpoparia imparepunctata (Oberthür, 1890)

References
 Calpoparia at Markku Savela's Lepidoptera and Some Other Life Forms
 Natural History Museum Lepidoptera genus database

Noctuidae